Valentin Tomov (born 14 May 1996 in Plovdiv) is a Bulgarian footballer who currently plays as a midfielder for A.C.D. Treviso 2013 / Treviso.

Career

Botev Plovdiv
Tomov was the captain of Botev Plovdiv U19 team in season 2013-14. He participated in 29 games and scored 9 goals.

Tomov was promoted to the Botev Plovdiv U21 team. He was included for the first time in the first team for the away game with Haskovo which Botev won by a score of 2-1 but he remained an unused substitute.

On 30 June 2015 Tomov won the Bulgarian U19 cup with Botev Plovdiv and scored a goal in the final game against Lokomotiv Sofia. In January 2016 Tomov was released from Botev Plovdiv.

References

1996 births
Living people
Bulgarian footballers
Botev Plovdiv players
Association football midfielders